Chatchai Narkwijit (born September 13, 1988) is a professional footballer from Thailand.

Club career

Honours

Club
Muangthong United
 Thai Division 2 League Champions (1) : 2007

Chiangrai United
 Thai Division 2 League Champions (1) : 2009

Chiangmai 
 Thai Division 2 League Champions (1) : 2013

JL Chiangmai United
 Thai League 4 Champions (1) : 2017
 Thai League 3 Champions (1) : 2018

External links
 Profile at Goal

1988 births
Living people
Chatchai Narkwijit
Chatchai Narkwijit
Association football forwards
Chatchai Narkwijit
Chatchai Narkwijit
Chatchai Narkwijit
Chatchai Narkwijit
Chatchai Narkwijit
Chatchai Narkwijit